Stock Island is a census-designated place (CDP) and unincorporated community on an island of the same name in Monroe County, Florida, United States. The population of the CDP was 4,722 at the 2020 census, up from 3,919 in 2010. It is located on the portion of the island south of US 1. It is supposedly named for the herds of livestock formerly kept there. Alternatively, some local historians suggest that it may be named for an early settler.

Geography
Stock Island is located at  (24.570075, -81.737376).

US 1 (or the Overseas Highway) crosses the key at approximately mile markers 4–6, immediately east of Key West.

Demographics

2020 census

As of the 2020 United States census, there were 4,722 people, 1,584 households, and 1,081 families residing in the CDP.

2000 census
As of the census of 2000, there were 4,410 people, 1,713 households, and 1,050 families residing in the CDP. The population density was 1,891.9/km (4,919.1/mi2). There were 1,855 housing units at an average density of 795.8/km (2,069.2/mi2). The racial makeup of the CDP was 79.95% White, 10.45% African American, 0.36% Native American, 1.09% Asian, 0.05% Pacific Islander, 4.76% from other races, and 3.33% from two or more races. Hispanic or Latino of any race were 43.33% of the population.

There were 1,713 households, out of which 29.6% had children under the age of 18 living with them, 39.5% were married couples living together, 15.4% had a female householder with no husband present, and 38.7% were non-families. 26.0% of all households were made up of individuals, and 5.4% had someone living alone who was 65 years of age or older. The average household size was 2.57 and the average family size was 3.12.

In the CDP, the population was spread out, with 23.5% under the age of 18, 8.3% from 18 to 24, 33.2% from 25 to 44, 26.5% from 45 to 64, and 8.5% who were 65 years of age or older. The median age was 37 years. For every 100 females, there were 118.6 males. For every 100 females age 18 and over, there were 118.8 males.

The median income for a household in the CDP was $31,537, and the median income for a family was $38,029. Males had a median income of $23,714 versus $20,182 for females. The per capita income for the CDP was $14,346. About 19.2% of families and 20.5% of the population were below the poverty line, including 28.9% of those under age 18 and 16.2% of those age 65 or over.

Education
Monroe County School District operates public schools serving Stock Island. Three schools in the City of Key West, Gerald Adams on Stock Island and Horace O'Bryant Middle School and Key West High School, located on Key West Island, serve Stock Island. College of the Florida Keys is located here as well.

About the community
The community tends to be residential in character, rather than the tourist-oriented Key West, with a year-round population. Stock Island has a thriving artist community with specific enclaves that encompass two or more artists/shops: Stock Yard Studios, the Art Shack, Washed Up Studios, Art at the Perry Hotel, Studios at Stock Island Marina Village & Studios at Safe Harbor.

Ten marinas and boat yards on the island are home to live-aboard residents, offer transient slips, charters and water sports activities. 3D Boat Yard, Cow Key Marina, Hurricane Hole Restaurants & Marina, Murray Marine, Ocean's Edge Key West Hotel and Marina, Robbie's Full Service Marina, Safe Harbor Marina, Stock Island Marina Village/Perry Hotel and Marina, Stock Island Yacht Club & Marina and Sunset Marina.

There are many restaurants and food trucks Chicos Cantina, Croissants de Stock Island, Dolphin Deli, El Mocho, El Siboney Stock Island, Hog Fish Bar & Grill, Hurricane Joe's Bar & Grill, Lost Kitchen Supper Club, Matt's Stock Island Kitchen & Bar, Sloppy Joe's Dockside, One Love Food Truck, Roostica Wood-Fired Pizza, Dolphin Deli, Salty Oyster Dockside Bar & Grill, Stock Island Barrel House, Stock Rock Cafe, Taco Express, The Club at Stock Island Yacht Club, The Jerk, Until It's Gone, Yahman's Authentic Jamaican Jerk Shack, and Yellowfin Bar & Grill. There is one distillery and two craft breweries.

I Love Stock Island runs a three-day festival in December featuring a lighted boat parade, tours of the island, and culinary contests. They also promote the artist and business community and organize quarterly island-wide clean up days.

The Key West Golf Club and residential complex, which takes up nearly one-quarter of the island is on the City of Key West side.

References

Unincorporated communities in Monroe County, Florida
Census-designated places in Monroe County, Florida
Suburbs of Key West
Census-designated places in Florida
Unincorporated communities in Florida
Populated coastal places in Florida on the Atlantic Ocean